Bobby Durham (February 3, 1937 – July 6, 2008) was an American jazz drummer.

Durham was born in Philadelphia and learned to play drums while a child. He played with The Orioles at age 16, and was in a military band between 1956 and 1959. After his discharge, he played with King James and Stan Hunter. In 1960, he moved to New York City, where he played with Lloyd Price, Wild Bill Davis, Lionel Hampton, Count Basie, Slide Hampton, Grant Green, Sweets Edison, Tommy Flanagan, Jimmy Rowles, and the Duke Ellington Orchestra, in which he played for five months.  While working with Basie, he met Al Grey, and was a member of several of Grey's small ensembles. He accompanied Ella Fitzgerald for more than a decade, and worked with Oscar Peterson in a trio setting.

Durham also played in trios with organists such as Charles Earland and Shirley Scott, and there was a resurgence in interest in Durham's work during the acid jazz upswing in the 1990s. Many of Durham's projects, both as sideman and as leader, came about because of his association with producer Norman Granz, who used him in performances with Ella Fitzgerald, Count Basie, Harry Edison, Tommy Flanagan, and Joe Pass. Durham led his own combos as well; he is noted for scat singing along with his drum solos. Durham has also performed often with pop and soul musicians such as Frank Sinatra, James Brown, Ray Charles, and Marvin Gaye.

He died of lung cancer in Genoa, Italy, aged 71.

Discography

As leader
 Bobby Durham Trio/Gerald Price 1979
 Domani's Blues, 2005
 For Lovers Only, 2005
 We Three Plus Friends, featuring Massimo Faraò and Paolo Benedettini, 2001
 Christmas Jazz, 2006

As sideman
With Monty Alexander
 We've Only Just Begun (BASF)
With Wild Bill Davis and Johnny Hodges
Wild Bill Davis & Johnny Hodges in Atlantic City (RCA Victor, 1966)
With Charles Earland
Boss Organ (Choice, 1966 [1969])
Smokin' (Muse, 1969/77 [1977])
Mama Roots (Muse, 1969/77 [1977])
With Tommy Flanagan
The Tommy Flanagan Tokyo Recital (Pablo, 1975)
Straight Ahead (Pablo, 1976) with Eddie "Lockjaw" Davis
With Al Grey
Grey's Mood (Black and Blue, 1973-75 [1979])
Struttin' and Shoutin' (Columbia, 1976 [1983])
The New Al Grey Quintet (Chiaroscuro, 1988)
With Red Holloway
 The Burner (Prestige, 1963)
With Milt Jackson
 Loose Walk (Palcoscenico)
With Clifford Jordan
 Soul Fountain (Vortex, 1966 [1970])
With Jay McShann
Some Blues (Chiaroscuro, 1993)
With Shirley Scott
 Mystical Lady (Cadet, 1971)
With Oscar Peterson
 The Way I Really Play (Pausa, 1968)
 The Great Oscar Peterson on Prestige (Prestige, 1968)
With Joe Pass
Portraits of Duke Ellington  (Pablo, 1974)
With Al Grey
 The New Al Grey Quintet (Chiaroscuro, 1988)
 Live at the Floating Jazz Festival (Chiaroscuro, 1990)
With Jesse Green
 Lift Off (Chiaroscuro, 1990)
With Shawnn Monteiro and Massimo Faraò Trio
 Never Let Me Go (Azzurra Music, March 2001)
With Waymon Reed
 46th and 8th (Artists House, 1977 [1979])

References

1937 births
2008 deaths
American jazz drummers
Musicians from Philadelphia
Duke Ellington Orchestra members
20th-century American drummers
American male drummers
Jazz musicians from Pennsylvania
American male jazz musicians
Black & Blue Records artists
Chiaroscuro Records artists
20th-century American male musicians
Oscar Peterson Trio members